Juma Salem Johar (born 20 August 1970) is a Qatari footballer. He competed in the men's tournament at the 1992 Summer Olympics.

References

External links
 

1970 births
Living people
Qatari footballers
Qatar international footballers
Olympic footballers of Qatar
Qatar Stars League players
Al-Wakrah SC players
Qatar SC players
Footballers at the 1992 Summer Olympics
Place of birth missing (living people)
Association football defenders
Footballers at the 1994 Asian Games
Asian Games competitors for Qatar